Raquel Socías (born 7 October 1975) is a Spanish rugby union player. She played the position of center (no 12 or 13) for the Olímpico R.C. club, and in the  Spain women's national rugby union team. She has 39 international caps. She is the coach for  Tecnidex Valencia Rugby .

She competed at the 2006 Women's Rugby World Cup.

She competed at the 2009 Rugby World Cup Sevens, and Women's Six Nations Tournament.

References

External links 

 PODCAST Rugby: Leyenda Raquel Socías, Copa de la Reina de Seven, 11/05/2022
1975 births
Spanish rugby union players
Spanish rugby sevens players
Living people